Renmark Airport  is an airport serving Renmark, South Australia.

Facilities
There are two other runways, 12/30  and a parallel 07/25. Both of these are marked as being for gliders only.

Accidents and incidents
The 2017 South Australia Cessna Conquest crash occurred near Renmark airport on 30 May 2017, when a practice flight performed on a Cessna 441 Conquest II plane by charter airline Rossair crashed, killing its three occupants.

See also
 List of airports in South Australia

References

External links
 

Airports in South Australia